World Tibet News (WTN) as well as World Tibet Network News, is a website created in 1992 by Thubten Samdup and the NGO Canada Tibet Committee.
This site publishes daily information about Tibet and Tibetans in exile in English and French.

History 

The Tibetan community in Canada initially supported the Tibetans in India, in Nepal and Tibet by the Canada Tibet Committee, an association founded in 1987. With this association that he co-founded, Thubten Samdup and three other editors created in 1992 an information website in order to connect all Tibetans and Tibet support groups in Canada. Its aim was then to educate the Canadian public on issues concerning Tibet as well as practitioners of Tibetan Buddhism, both the converts and those who immigrated to Canada from Tibet and India to provide them with information and prompt them to develop social networks in their communities. 
This site initially called CanTibNet (CTN),  was quickly used and valued by many Tibetans and friends of Tibet outside Canada. Therefore, it was renamed World Tibet Network.
The site based in Montreal offers free annonces and send regularly its newsletter on Tibetan issues extracted from global sources among which the research and news organization about Tibet Tibet Information Network, as well as press releases, for "urgent action alerts" and information of non-governmental and governmental organizations such as the Central Tibetan Administration and various support groups for Tibet. WTN has played an important role in several campaigns, including the release of Gendun Rinchen and opposition campaigns to the Beijing Olympics bid and renewal of the Most favoured nation by President Bill Clinton. In 1999, the service reached more than 40 countries. Its archives dating back 1992 have 8000 articles. Three of the five publishers are Tibetans. Nowadays, WTN is among the still active networks  and informs the Tibetans and their friends around the world about Tibet and Tibetans in exile.

References

External links
Official site

Mass media in Montreal
Tibet
Tibetan diaspora
Tibetan news websites
Tibetan society
Internet properties established in 1992
1992 in Tibet